The Roman Catholic Diocese of São José dos Pinhais is a Latin rite diocese  in the Ecclesiastical province of Curitiba in southern Brazil.

Its see is Catedral de São José, dedicated to Saint Joseph, in the city of São José dos Pinhais in Paraná state.

Statistics 
As per 2015, it pastorally served 667,752 Catholics (79.9% of 835,575 total) on 7,186 km² in 38 parishes with 75 priests (34 diocesan, 41 religious), 45 deacons, 190 lay religious (85 brothers, 105 sisters) and 10 seminarians.

History
 Established on 6 December 2006 as Diocese of São José dos Pinhais, on territory split off from the Archdiocese of Curitiba, which remains its Metropolitan.

Episcopal Ordinaries 
(all native Brazilians and Roman Rite)

 Ladislau Biernaski, Lazarists (C.M.) (6 December 2006 – death 13 February 2012), previously Titular Bishop of Tetci (1979.04.19 – 2006.12.06) and Auxiliary Bishop of Curitiba (1979.04.19 – 2006.12.06)
 Francisco Carlos Bach (3 October 2012 – 2017.04.19), also Apostolic Administrator of Roman Catholic Diocese of Paranaguá (2015.04.11 – 2015.11.25); previously Bishop of Toledo (Brazil) (2005.07.27 – 2012.10.03); next Bishop of Joinville (2017.04.19 – ...)
 Celso Antônio Marchiori (2017.12.13 – ...), previously Bishop of Apucarana) (2009.07.08 – 2017.12.13).

Sources and external links
 GCatholic.org - data for all sections, with Google map
 Catholic Hierarchy

Roman Catholic dioceses in Brazil
Roman Catholic Ecclesiastical Province of Curitiba
Christian organizations established in 2006
Roman Catholic dioceses and prelatures established in the 21st century
São José dos Pinhais